UDP-glucuronosyltransferase 2B15 is an enzyme that in humans is encoded by the UGT2B15 gene.

The UGTs are of major importance in the conjugation and subsequent elimination of potentially toxic xenobiotics and endogenous compounds. UGT2B8 demonstrates reactivity with estriol. See UGT2B4 (MIM 600067).[supplied by OMIM]

References

Further reading